AEH may refer to:

 Augustus Edward Hough Love, or A.E.H. Love, a mathematician from the UK
 Abéché Airport, an airport in Chad with the IATA airport code AEH
Aegon N.V. 6.375% Perpetual Capital Securities (New York Stock Exchange code AEH)